Robert W. Cherry (born October 22, 1947) is an American politician. He is a member of the Indiana House of Representatives from the 53rd District, serving since 1998. He is a member of the Republican party. He previously served on the Hancock County Council from 1992 to 1996.

References

Living people
Republican Party members of the Indiana House of Representatives
People from Shelbyville, Indiana
1947 births
21st-century American politicians